Parerythrobacter jejuensis  is a Gram-negative, strictly aerobic, rod-shaped and non-motile bacteria from the genus Parerythrobacter which has been isolated from seawater from the coast of Jeju Island in Korea.

References

Further reading

External links
Type strain of Erythrobacter jejuensis at BacDive -  the Bacterial Diversity Metadatabase

Sphingomonadales
Bacteria described in 2013